The 2003–04 Latvian Hockey League season was the 13th season of the Latvian Hockey League, the top level of ice hockey in Latvia. Nine teams participated in the league, and HK Riga 2000 won the championship.

Regular season

Group A

Group B

Playoffs 
Quarterfinals
SC Energija - HK Vilki Riga 2-1 on series
ASK/Ogre - Prizma/Riga 86 2-0 on series
HK Liepajas Metalurgs - HK Zemgale 2-0 on series
HK Riga 2000 - HK Riga 85 2-0 on series
Semifinals
ASK/Ogre - SC Energija 2-0 on series
HK Riga 2000 - HK Liepajas Metalurgs 2-1 on series
Final
HK Riga 2000 - ASK/Ogre 2-0 on series
3rd place
HK Liepajas Metalurgs - SC Energija 2-1 on series

5th place

External links
 Season on hockeyarchives.info

Latvian Hockey League
Latvian Hockey League seasons
Latvian